State Highway 85  (SH 85) is a South Island state highway in New Zealand, servicing the Maniototo Plains and the North and Central Otago regions of the South Island between the major settlements of Alexandra and Palmerston. It is wholly two lane and passes through some of the most extreme climatic regions in New Zealand. The highway is known colloquially as "The Pigroot". Though there is no definitive explanation for this name, A. W. Reed, in his book Place Names of New Zealand, mentions an incident during John Turnbull Thomson's survey of inland Otago in which local wild pigs were so unafraid of humans that a huge boar approached his party and rubbed its nose against that of Thomson's horse.

Route
SH 85 leaves Alexandra town centre and runs in a northerly direction parallel (but not directly next to) with the Manuherikia River. After passing through Chatto Creek, Omakau, Lauder and Becks, the road crosses the river and ascends onto the high plateau known as the Maniototo Plains.

The road then veers to the southeast and runs across the plains through Idaburn and Wedderburn before the road "detours" to go to Ranfurly. After Ranfurly, the road resumes its original direction and after Kyeburn, the road descends through the Kakanui Ranges as well as through Morrisons and Dunback and the Inch Valley to emerge at Palmerston.

See also
List of New Zealand state highways

References

External links
 New Zealand Transport Agency

85
Transport in Otago